Two's a Party is the tenth and final collaborative studio album by Conway Twitty and Loretta Lynn. It was released on February 2, 1981, by MCA Records. This would be the duo's last album of all new material to be released. Their next and final release, Making Believe, would be a compilation of new and previously released material.

Critical reception

Billboard published a review in the February 14, 1981 issue which said, "Some things grow better and better with time and the pairing of Conway Twitty with Loretta Lynn is one of them. The irrepressible Lynn sparks with customary vitality as she pits her husky vocals against Twitty's resonant tones on this well-balanced love medley. Chancey's production is tuned to perfection, showcasing both artists' talents in fine style." The review noted "Silent Partner", "Lovin' What Your Lovin' Does to Me", "Two's a Party", "Oh Honey, Oh Babe", and "If I Ever Had to Say Goodbye to You" as the best cuts on the album.

In the February 21, 1981 issue, Cashbox published a review saying, "Conway Twitty and Loretta Lynn have long been considered one of country music’s premiere vocal teamings. Their latest duet package proves they are not resting on past laurels, but are forging ahead; and in a few particular cases, experimenting
somewhat. For instance, "Silent Partner" is somewhat of a departure from their usual sound. The tune features rock-ish
overtones, accentuated by Twitty's growling vocals and Lynn's saucy replies. As usual, the album features a number of excellent
love songs, including "I Still Believe in Waltzes"."

According to Stephen Thomas Erlewine of AllMusic, Two's a Party is not "one of Conway and Loretta's very best records" but there are enough strong tracks "to make it worthwhile for dedicated fans."

Commercial performance 
The album peaked at No. 28 on the US Billboard Hot Country LP's chart, the duo's lowest position on the chart at the time.

The album's first single, "Lovin' What Your Lovin' Does to Me", was released in January 1981 and peaked at No. 7 on the US Billboard Hot Country Singles chart, marking the duo's eleventh top 10 hit on the chart. In Canada, it peaked at No. 5 on the RPM Country Singles chart. The album's second single, "I Still Believe in Waltzes", was released in May 1981 and peaked at No. 2 in the US and No .3 in Canada, becoming the duo's twelfth and final top ten hit in both countries.

Track listing

Personnel 
Adapted from the album liner notes.

Production:
Bergen White – String Arrangements
Jan Weinberg – Design
Russ Martin – Engineer
Hank Williams – Mastering
Larry Dupont – Photography (back cover)
Dennis Carney – Photography (front cover)
Conway Twitty – Producer
Loretta Lynn – Producer
Ron Chancey – Producer
Danny Hilley – Recording, Mixing

Musicians:
Johnny Christopher – acoustic guitar
Paul Uhrig – bass
Clay Caire – drums
Jerry Carrigan – drums, percussion
Samuel Levine – flute
Eberhard Ramm – French horn
Shane Keister – keyboards
Reggie Young – lead guitar
John Hughey – steel guitar
The Sheldon Kurland Strings – strings

Vocals:
Conway Twitty – lead vocals
Loretta Lynn – lead vocals
Donna McCroy – backing vocals
Duane West – backing vocals
Jackie Cusic – backing vocals
Lea Jane Berinati – backing vocals
Tom Brannon – backing vocals
Vicki Hampton – backing vocals
Yvonne Hodges – backing vocals

Charts

Album

Singles

References 

1981 albums
Loretta Lynn albums
Conway Twitty albums
Albums produced by Ron Chancey
MCA Records albums